Radical 214 meaning "flute" is the only one of the 214  Kangxi radicals that is composed of 17 strokes, making it the radical that requires the most strokes.

In the Kangxi Dictionary there are 21 characters (out of 40,000) to be found under this radical.

Characters with Radical 214

Literature 

Leyi Li: “Tracing the Roots of Chinese Characters: 500 Cases”. Beijing 1993,

External links
Unihan Database – U+9FA0

214